Vetlyany is a rural locality (a settlement) in Dobryansky District, Perm Krai, Russia. The population was 100 as of 2010. There are 15 streets.

Geography 
Vetlyany is located 48 km southeast of Dobryanka (the district's administrative centre) by road. Ust-Shalashnaya is the nearest rural locality.

References 

Rural localities in Dobryansky District